Simon Danner (born December 25, 1986) is a German professional ice hockey forward who currently plays for EHC Freiburg of the DEL2. Danner previously played in the Deutsche Eishockey Liga (DEL) with the DEG Metro Stars after he joined them from the Frankfurt Lions on July 13, 2010. After two seasons with the Metro Stars, Danner signed a one-year contract with Grizzly Adams Wolfsburg on April 2, 2012.

Career statistics

Regular season and playoffs

International

References

External links

1986 births
Living people
Augsburger Panther players
DEG Metro Stars players
Frankfurt Lions players
EHC Freiburg players
Schwenninger Wild Wings players
Grizzlys Wolfsburg players
German ice hockey right wingers
Sportspeople from Freiburg im Breisgau